Neogene steinbachi is a moth of the  family Sphingidae. It is known from Bolivia.

Adults have been recorded in August.

References

Neogene (moth)
Moths described in 1924